Jintonglu  is a station on Line 3 of Chongqing Rail Transit in Chongqing Municipality, China. It is located in Yubei District. It opened in 2011.

Station structure

References

Yubei District
Railway stations in Chongqing
Railway stations in China opened in 2011
Chongqing Rail Transit stations